Women in Cages is a 1971 women in prison sexploitation film directed by Gerardo de León and starring Jennifer Gan, Judy Brown, Roberta Collins, and Pam Grier. Co-produced by Roger Corman, it was prominently featured in the Planet Terror portion of the 2007 film Grindhouse. Grindhouse director Quentin Tarantino said of the film, "I'm a huge, huge fan of Gerry de Leon.... the film is just harsh, harsh, harsh." He described the final shot as one of "devastating despair".

Plot

Carol "Jeff" Jeffries (Jennifer Gan) is set up by her boyfriend, Rudy (Charlie Davao). Jeff does not realize that Rudy runs a ship-board prostitution, gambling, and drug dealing empire. Rudy sees the heat closing in on him and stashes his illegal goods in Jeff's purse.

Thrown into a harsh prison where the inmates are kept barefoot and subjected to hard labor and sadistic punishment, Jeff encounters Alabama (Pam Grier), a sadistic lesbian guard fond of torture. Cellmate Stokes (Roberta Collins) is a heroin addict who agrees to a plot against Jeff that will secure her more heroin. Another cellmate Sandy (Judy Brown) also agrees to a plot against Jeff that could secure her own release. Their other cellmate Theresa (Sofia Moran) is Alabama's girlfriend. Jeff endures a horrible experience made worse by her cellmates as she struggles day to day.

Finally realizing her boyfriend is not helping her, Jeff hopes to escape through the jungle. She then learns that local poachers are paid to track and kill escapees, who inevitably become lost in the wilds surrounding the prison.

When Theresa falls out of favor with Alabama and loses her privileged position in the cell block, escape becomes an attractive option to her. Theresa reveals that she knows the jungle well and can obtain outside help. Despite the fact that two of her three cellmates had previously agreed to covert plots against Jeff, all three of them accompany her on the escape.

DVD releases

Women in Cages has been issued numerous times on DVD since the original release and prior VHS issues due to continued interest in Roger Corman productions. Most recently it was released by Shout! Factory as part of Roger Corman's Cult Classics on June 21, 2011.

See also
 List of American films of 1971

References

External links
 
 

1971 films
1970s English-language films
Films directed by Gerardo de León
American sexploitation films
Women in prison films
New World Pictures films
1970s exploitation films
1970s prison films
Cockfighting in film
1970s American films